Parliamentary elections were held in Iraq on 15 June 1948 to elect the members of the Chamber of Deputies. The majority of seats were won by independents.

Results

References

Elections in Iraq
Iraq
Parliamentary
Iraq